"When It's Love" is a power ballad by American rock band Van Halen. It was released in 1988 as the second single from their eighth studio album OU812. It was the most popular song from that album, hitting #1 on the Billboard Mainstream Rock charts and #5 on the Billboard Hot 100 chart. The song has been a live performance staple since it was released in 1988. The song was also included in the set list for the band's ill-fated 1998 tour with Gary Cherone. Eddie Van Halen has stated that this particular guitar solo is a nod to Eric Clapton.

Reception
It was featured on a VH1 special, The Greatest: 25 Greatest Power Ballads, where it was ranked as the 24th greatest power ballad of all time.

Charts

Weekly charts

Year-end charts

See also
List of glam metal albums and songs

References

Further reading

1988 singles
Van Halen songs
1988 songs
Warner Records singles
1980s ballads
Songs written by Eddie Van Halen
Songs written by Alex Van Halen
Songs written by Michael Anthony (musician)
Songs written by Sammy Hagar
Glam metal ballads